Starck is a German surname, which means a strong, bold person, from the Middle High German starke, meaning "strong" or "brave". The name may refer to:

Colby Starck (born 1974), American musician
Johann August von Starck (1741–1816), German writer
Karl von Starck (1867–1937), German politician
Philippe Starck (born 1949), French designer
Ville-Valtteri Starck (born 1995), Finnish footballer

See also
Starck (disambiguation)
Stark (surname)

References

German-language surnames